Hisanai Tameike Dam  is an earthfill dam located in Iwate Prefecture in Japan. The dam is used for irrigation. The catchment area of the dam is 7.6 km2. The dam can store 650 thousand cubic meters of water. The construction of the dam was started on 1980 and completed in 1982.

See also
List of dams in Japan

References

Dams in Iwate Prefecture